The 2012 Kazakhstan Premier League was the 21st season of the Kazakhstan Premier League, the highest football league competition in Kazakhstan.

The league was expanded from twelve to fourteen teams for this season.

Changes from 2011 season
The league was expanded from twelve to fourteen teams for this season. This also led to a change in the competition modus. The second phase with it separate play-off groups for championship and relegation has been abolished; all teams will play a single home-and-away round-robin schedule.

Teams

Promoted
 Sunkar
 Okzhetpes
 Akzhayik

Relegated
 Vostok

Personnel and kits

Note: Flags indicate national team as has been defined under FIFA eligibility rules. Players and Managers may hold more than one non-FIFA nationality.

Managerial changes

Foreign players
The number of foreign players is restricted to eight per KPL team. A team can use only five foreign players on the field in each game.

In bold: Players that have been capped for their national team.

League table

Results

Top goalscorers

References

Kazakhstan Premier League seasons
1
Kazakh
Kazakh